Noam Okun and Amir Weintraub were the defending champions, but they didn't start this year.
Carsten Ball and Chris Guccione won the tournament, after defeating Sanchai Ratiwatana and Sonchat Ratiwatana in the final 6–3, 6–2.

Seeds

Draw

Draw

References
 Doubles Draw
 Qualifying Draw

Comerica Bank Challenger - Doubles
Nordic Naturals Challenger